Emmett Earl Lynn (February 14, 1897 – October 20, 1958) was an American actor of the stage and screen.

Early life 
Lynn was born in Muscatine, Iowa. When he was nine years old, Lynn became a song plugger in Denver, Colorado. From that beginning he moved to performing in a children's revue. Gus Edwards spotted Lynn and put him in a production of Edwards' School Days. Lynn served in the Army during World War I.

Career 
An eccentric character comedian in vaudeville, he later produced travelling road companies known variously as the Novelty Players, the Emmett Lynn Musical Comedy Company and the Emmett Lynn Players, of which he was its star comedian and usually billed as "Emmett 'Pap' Lynn; his troupes flourished in the 1920s and early 1930s. By 1935, he was just one of the comedians in a travellng musical revue called The Passing Show. 

Lynn began working in films for Biograph Studios in 1913. On screen, Lynn appeared in over 140 films between 1940 and 1956. He made several television appearances from 1949 until his death, especially in westerns. He was featured in nine episodes of The Lone Ranger during the final decade of his life.

On Broadway, Lynn appeared in Gasoline Gypsies (1931).

Death 
He died in Hollywood, California from ventricular fibrillation due to a coronary occlusion.

Selected filmography

 Grandpa Goes to Town (1940)
 Wagon Train (1940)
 Robbers of the Range (1941)
 The Spoilers (1942)
 Westward Ho (1942)
 Outlaws of Pine Ridge (1942)
 Queen of Broadway (1942)
 In Old California (1942)
 Days of Old Cheyenne (1943)
 Frontier Outlaws (1944)
 The Yoke's on Me (1944)
 The Town Went Wild (1944)
 Swing Hostess (1944) - Blodgett
 Shadow of Terror (1945)
 Gangster's Den (1945)
 Landrush (1946)
 Code of the West (1947)
 Oregon Trail Scouts (1947)
 Trail of the Mounties (1947)
 Grand Canyon Trail (1948)
 Ride, Ryder, Ride! (1949)
 The Fighting Redhead (1949)
 Roll, Thunder, Roll! (1949)
 The Traveling Saleswoman (1950)
 Badman's Gold (1951)
 Desert Pursuit (1952)
 Lone Star (1952) - Josh
 Skirts Ahoy! (1952)
 Northern Patrol (1953)
 The Homesteaders (1953)
 Bait (1954)
 Ring of Fear (1954)
 Stranger on Horseback (1955)

Selected television

References

External links

1897 births
1958 deaths
American male film actors
American male television actors
20th-century American male actors
People from Muscatine, Iowa
Vaudeville performers